Kupang Regency is a regency in East Nusa Tenggara province of Indonesia. It occupies the far western end of Timor Island (apart from the area of Kupang city, which has been administratively separated from the Regency since 11 April 1996), together with the small offshore island of Semau (off the western tip of Timor). Other islands to the southwest and west which were formerly part of Kupang Regency have been separated administratively - the Rote Islands Group on 10 April 2002 (to form Rote Ndao Regency), and the Savu Islands on 29 October 2008 (to form Sabu Raijua Regency).

Administration 
The regency is divided into twenty-four districts (kecamatan), tabulated below with their areas and their populations at the 2010 Census and the 2020 Census, together with the official estimates as at mid 2021. The table also includes the locations of the district administrative centres, the number of villages (rural desa / urban kelurahan) in each district, and its post code.

References

External links 
 

Regencies of East Nusa Tenggara